Alejandro Covarrubias (born September 17, 1991) is an American soccer player who plays as a midfielder..

Youth and college career 
Covarrubias spent his high school years playing for the LA Galaxy youth academy before attending Cerritos College to play college soccer. A standout his freshman and sophomore years, Covarrubias transferred to California State University, Dominguez Hills to play college soccer for their team. In his first, and only season with the Toros, Covarrubias started every game and registered six goals and five assists in eighteen appearances for the Toros.

Senior career 
Upon his junior year of college, Covarrubias opted to forgo his senior year and join LA Galaxy II, the Galaxy's reserve side. Covarrubias signed with United Soccer League side Oklahoma City Energy on December 15, 2016. He returned to Los Angeles on May 18, 2017.

Covarrubias signed with Fresno FC on January 10, 2018, for the 2018 season.

After a spell with USL PDL side Des Moines Menace, Covarrubias signed with USL side Tulsa Roughnecks on July 27, 2018.

International career 
Covarrubias was capped once in 2010 for the United States U18 squad.

References

External links 
 Cal State Dominguez Hills Profile

1991 births
Living people
American soccer players
Cerritos Falcons men's soccer players
Cal State Dominguez Hills Toros men's soccer players
LA Galaxy II players
OKC Energy FC players
Fresno FC players
Des Moines Menace players
FC Tulsa players
Association football midfielders
Soccer players from California
USL League Two players
United States men's youth international soccer players
Sportspeople from Los Angeles County, California
USL Championship players